Sun Jinlong (born January 1962) is a Chinese politician, serving since 2016 as the Party Branch Secretary of the Xinjiang Production and Construction Corps. Sun came to prominence in 2001, serving on the Secretariat of the Communist Youth League, then held office as party chief of Hefei, and the Deputy Communist Party Secretary of Anhui and secretary of the provincial Political and Legal Affairs Commission, and the Deputy Communist Party Secretary of Hunan province. In July 2020, the United States announced Global Magnitsky Act sanctions against Sun Jinlong for human rights abuses against Uyghurs and other ethnic minorities in Xinjiang.

Early life and education
Sun was born in 1962 in Zhongxiang, Hubei province. He attended the Wuhan College of Geology (later folded into the China University of Geosciences), where he studied mining exploration. He then pursued graduate studies in the subject. Later he earned a master's and doctorate degrees in economics from Nankai University and Renmin University.

Career 
In 1986, he joined a squad of engineers in Liaoning.  He joined the Chinese Communist Party (CCP) in April 1986, and began taking on administrative and leadership roles on the team. In 1990, he was named a "National Model Worker" and a "Provincial Model Worker".

In July 1991, he was named vice president of China Geological Engineering Company, at 29 years of age. He was stationed in Pakistan for a period of time. Two years later he was promoted to president and party chief. In January 1995, Sun was recruited to the Communist Youth League and subsequently earned his degrees from Nankai University and Renmin University. In December 2001 he was named a Secretary of the Secretariat of the Communist Youth League.

In April 2003, he was transferred to Anhui to join the provincial party leadership council and head of the provincial Political and Legal Affairs Commission. In March 2005 he became party chief of Hefei. In Hefei, Sun was known for centralizing control and taking on ambitious infrastructure projects which resulted in significant decreases in congestion in the city, and also for fueling the city's economic growth. In July 2011, he was named Deputy Communist Party Secretary of Anhui province; in April 2013, he was transferred to Hunan province to serve as deputy party chief there. Sun was transferred to Xinjiang in 2016, taking office as the Communist Party Secretary of the Xinjiang Production and Construction Corps (minister-level).

Sun was an alternate member of the 17th and 18th Central Committees of the Chinese Communist Party.

In April 2020 Sun was made the Party Branch Secretary of the Ministry of Ecology and Environment.

On 31 July 2020, the United States government imposed Global Magnitsky Human Rights Accountability Act sanctions and visa restrictions against Sun, together with his deputy Peng Jiarui for their connection to similar human rights abuse against the ethnic minorities in Xinjiang.

References

1962 births
Living people
People's Republic of China politicians from Hubei
Chinese Communist Party politicians from Hubei
Renmin University of China alumni
China University of Geosciences alumni
Nankai University alumni
Political office-holders in Hunan
Political office-holders in Anhui
Politicians from Jingmen
Alternate members of the 17th Central Committee of the Chinese Communist Party
Alternate members of the 18th Central Committee of the Chinese Communist Party
People sanctioned under the Magnitsky Act